Frank Mulzoff (August 5, 1928 – November 30, 2017) was an American college basketball player and head coach, both for the St. John's Redmen men's basketball team.

College playing career 
As a 6'3" forward, Mulzoff played basketball collegiately at St. John's University for three seasons when it was located in Brooklyn, New York. Along with Al McGuire, he was co-captain of the varsity team as a senior during the 1950-1951 season, and helped lead the team to a 26-5 record, a berth in the NCAA Division I men's basketball tournament, and third place in the National Invitational Tournament.

Coaching career 
After his college playing career ended, Mulzoff coached high school basketball teams for many years. He became assistant basketball coach at St. John's, which by then had moved to Queens, New York, and was then elevated to head coach in 1970 when Lou Carnesecca left to coach the New York Nets, leading the team to two appearances in the National Invitational Tournament and one NCAA tournament in his three seasons. He resigned after the 1972-1973 season, and was replaced by Carnesecca, who returned from the Nets. Mulzoff then became head coach of the Cherry Hill Rookies of the Eastern Basketball Association and afterward continued to coach at high school, college, and minor league professional levels.

Head coaching record

NCAA Division 1

Minor League Professional Basketball Teams

References

External links 
 College playing record at Sports-Reference.com
 College coaching record at Sports-Reference.com

1928 births
2017 deaths
American men's basketball coaches
American men's basketball players
Basketball coaches from New York (state)
People from Queens, New York
Forwards (basketball)
Sportspeople from Queens, New York
Basketball players from New York City
St. John's Red Storm men's basketball players
St. John's Red Storm men's basketball coaches